New York's 145th State Assembly district is one of the 150 districts in the New York State Assembly. It has been represented by Angelo Morinello since 2017.

Geography

2020s
District 145 contains the town of Grand Island in Erie County and the western portion of Niagara County. It also includes a portion of the town of North Tonawanda.

2010s
District 145 contained the town of Grand Island in Erie County and the southern portion of Niagara County.

Recent election results

2022

2020

2018

2016
During the 2014-16 legislative session, then Republican-incumbent John Ceretto switched parties.

2014

2012

References

145
 Erie County, New York
 Niagara County, New York